Holopainen is a Finnish surname. Notable people with the surname include:

Ale Holopainen (1908–1974), Finnish farmer and politician
Ari Holopainen (born 1969), Finnish bandy player
Elisa Holopainen (born 2001), Finnish ice hockey player
Esa Holopainen (born 1972), the lead guitarist of Finnish metal band Amorphis
Hanna Holopainen, Finnish politician
Jalmari Holopainen (1892–1954), Finnish footballer
Mari Holopainen, Finnish politician
Pietari Holopainen (born 1982), Finnish footballer
Tuomas Holopainen (born 1976), the keyboardist of Finnish symphonic power metal band Nightwish
Veijo-Lassi Holopainen (1921–2006), Finnish field hockey player

References

Finnish-language surnames